Alexander Lippisch's Delta IV was a continuation of his work on delta wing designs pioneered in his Delta I, Delta II and Delta III aircraft.

Design and development
The project began with an order from Gerhard Fieseler for a design that his company could build for him to fly in the 1932 Europarundflug air rally. The result was a highly unorthodox design, sporting large delta wings, canards, and an engine and propeller mounted in both the nose and tail of the plane.

Fieseler built this design as the F 3 Wespe ("Wasp"), but it proved highly unstable, causing Fieseler to crash it on his first flight. Further refinements were unable to correct these deficiencies, and after one final crash, Fieseler abandoned the aircraft.

Lippisch continued to believe that the problems were surmountable, and found an ally in Professor Walter Georgii of the DFS (Deutsche Forschungsanstalt für Segelflug – German Research Institute for Sailplane Flight). Georgii secured funding from the RLM (Reichsluftfahrtministerium – Reich Air Ministry) to purchase the aircraft from Fieseler and work on perfecting it. At the DFS, Lippisch rebuilt the aircraft, removing the canards and the rear engine and renaming it the Delta IVa.

Although this flew much better than its predecessor, it was still involved in a very serious crash which led to an investigation of Lippisch's endeavours. The RLM and the DVL (Deutsche Versuchsanstalt für Luftfahrt – German Aviation Research Institute) eventually concluded that the Delta series was not only dangerous, but an aeronautical dead end. Only Georgii's continued support prevented them from ordering the discontinuation of the research.

The aircraft was rebuilt again, this time incorporating new aerodynamic refinements based on Lippisch's experiences with his recent Storch X glider. The new incarnation, dubbed Delta IVb proved to be a step in the right direction.

Success finally came with a last round of changes. The aircraft was rebuilt yet again, making the sweep of its wings less severe, and adding small, downturned fins at their tips. And the fuselage was lengthened somewhat, and a small rudder was added to it. Now called the Delta IVc, the result was finally what Lippisch had been looking for. In 1936, the aircraft was taken to the Luftwaffe flight-testing centre at Rechlin where test pilot Heini Dittmar put it through its paces, gaining an airworthiness certificate for the type and an official RLM designation – DFS 39.

It proved to be an extremely stable and well-behaved design, and now attracted the interest of the RLM as a starting point for "Project X" – the programme to develop a rocket-powered fighter aircraft. This would eventually lead to the development of the Messerschmitt Me 163 Komet.

Specifications (DFS 39d)

References

External links

DFS 39 prototype – Wehrmacht History

1930s German experimental aircraft
Tailless aircraft
Delta IV
Single-engined tractor aircraft
Low-wing aircraft